My Husband's Lover is a 2013 Philippine television drama romance series broadcast by GMA Network. The series is the first gay themed drama series in Philippine television. Directed by Dominic Zapata, it stars Dennis Trillo in the title role, Tom Rodriguez and Carla Abellana. It premiered on June 10, 2013 on the network's Telebabad line up replacing Love & Lies. The series concluded on October 18, 2013, with a total of 94 episodes.

The series is streaming online on YouTube.

Premise
Vincent Soriano gets his girlfriend Lally pregnant while they were still in college. They marry and raise a family. While Vincent keeps a secret from his wife, he is gay. When Vincent's former male lover, Eric returns to his life, they have an affair until Lally catches them.

Cast and characters

Lead cast
 Dennis Trillo as Eric del Mundo
 Tom Rodriguez as Vincent Soriano
 Carla Abellana as Lally Agatep-Soriano

Supporting cast
 Pancho Magno as Paul Salcedo
 Bettina Carlos as Vicky Araneta
 Karel Marquez as Evelyn Agatep
 Kevin Santos as Danny
 Victor Basa as David
 Glydel Mercado as Sandra Agatep
 Chanda Romero as Sol del Mundo
 Roi Vinzon as Armando Soriano
 Kuh Ledesma as Elaine Soriano

Recurring cast
 Antone Limgenco as Diego "Diegs" Soriano
 Elijah Alejo as Hanna "Munchkin" Soriano

Guest cast
 Keempee de Leon as Zandro "Zsa Zsa" Soriano
 Rodjun Cruz as Martin Lizada
 Roy Alvarez as Manuel Soriano
 Mark Gil as Galo Agatep
 Chynna Ortaleza as Stella
 Ashley Cabrera as Mikaella
 Jaclyn Jose as Charito Vda. de Carbonel
 Ryan Agoncillo as Sam

Production

Conception and development

Series' creator Suzette Doctolero began developing the series in early 2013. It all started with her desire to create a non-traditional, out of the box yet has social relevance, truthful, emotional and with "real" characters stories. The idea for the series was conceived when Doctolero began thinking about the question: "What would you do if you find out that you husband is cheating on you... with another man?" Although the idea is not-an-easy-story-to-tell because of its controversial theme which touches on the sensitive issue of homosexual and bisexual relationships, Doctolero explained that "the show is not all about the queerness of the characters but more of a love story and a family drama. When Doctolero presented the idea to GMA Network, the management said "yes" easily because they found the concept interesting and "it was based on the relatability of the masses to the topic."

Carolyn Galve served as the executive producer of the series throughout its run. Dominic Zapata was assigned to direct the show. Zapata said "It's very refreshing for me to direct this material. The subject is really sensitive and I want to be accurate in portraying how gay people are and the dynamics of gay relationships so we did a lot of research. I don't want to make a mistake or make a misrepresentation." Regarding the theme, Zapata stressed "I'm sure a lot of people are gonna say a thing or two about the show. All I really have to say is, this show is a love story. And love is a beautiful thing and it shines through no matter age, no matter race, no matter color, and no matter gender preference. Love is love and no matter what package it comes in, it's still beautiful."

Filming for the series began May 21, 2013. Many of the scenes were filmed on location in Quezon City. The show is designed for sixteen-week run. The show is extended for additional three weeks and concluded in October 2013.

The series' program manager, Helen Rose Sese clarified that the show won't delve on the sensual aspects of relationships—straight or not. "The show's intention is not to promote gay and lesbian relationship, but more of a reflection that this is happening now. The creative team will also be under scrutiny to try and avoid noise on the part of religious groups. We also make sure we don’t go beyond anything that will offend them, as well as the gay community." Sese also stressed that the network has informed the local censors' body on the potentially controversial series. The Movie and Television Review and Classification Board (MTRCB) has shown understanding of their material while warning them to observe certain limitations in presenting delicate scenes for general viewership. The show has been approved without cuts by the MTRCB, albeit with an SPG or Strong Parental Guidance rating.

A kissing scene between Tom Rodriguez and Dennis Trillo was supposed to be aired in the finale but was not shown due to MTRCB guidelines. The scene could be seen in the DVD version of the show.

Casting
The series featured three main characters and nine prominent recurring characters throughout its run. Dennis Trillo and Carla Abellana were the first two actors to be cast for the lead roles. Abellana was cast as Lally Agatep-Soriano, a woman who struggles to be the perfect wife for the husband she loves who, in fact is a closeted gay. Although she described the series as "a risky project", Abellana didn't have qualms accepting the role. She loves that the series encompasses a wider audience which include straight, gay, lesbian, married or single audience. Trillo, on the other hand had recently finishing Temptation of Wife, was chosen to play Eric del Mundo, a gay architect and the lover of Lally's husband, Vincent Soriano. Trillo was originally cast as Vincent Soriano but he decided to play Eric del Mundo instead. Trillo is not new to gay roles. He already played gay characters in the past – most particularly in 2004 period film Aishite Imasu 1941: Mahal Kita where he won and was nominated in several acting awards.

Tom Rodriguez was chosen to portray Vincent Soriano, a closeted gay, from many actors who auditioned for the said role. Rodriguez had to go through tests before being cast. He recently left ABS-CBN and signed GMA Network to appear in the show. During his audition, Rodriguez acted one scene—a break-up scene—with Trillo. Zapata described Rodriguez as "the perfect Vincent" among the many actors who auditioned for the role, said that "[While] the others treated homosexuality as a disease, Tom interpreted it with so much understanding, and that's what we're looking for." Rodriguez described his role as very complex and demanding as the whole conflict of the show lies in his character. Rodriguez said, to prepare for the project, he watched gay-themed films like Brokeback Mountain and Love of Siam and talked to people with similar stories. He also did research and found out that "homosexual love is not really different from a heterosexual one. But of course things are more difficult for them because of all the social biases that exist."

Singer Kuh Ledesma was signed on to portray Elaine Soriano, after reading the week 1 script. The role Armando Soriano was originally offered to Phillip Salvador but he turned it down, so the role went to Roi Vinzon. Bettina Carlos was signed on to play "the young cougar" Vicky Araneta, and said that "My role is seemingly simple but it's a challenge to make the cougar come out and give life to a young cougar." Victor Basa originally auditioned for the role of Vincent Soriano, but ended up portraying David, Vincent's all-out gayfriend and ex-lover. Basa finds his role quite difficult in the sense that he doesn't want his character to look "stereotype" or just like any other homosexual role seen in media.

Music
The main theme song of My Husband's Lover is "One More Try" by Kuh Ledesma, who also portrays Elaine Soriano in the show. This song is also  heard in the opening and ending credits of the show. The song was written by well-known composer Cecile Azarcon. It was released in 1984 and part of the album I Think I'm in Love and under the now-defunct Blackgold Records.

The secondary theme song, "Help Me Get Over" by Jonalyn Viray and was written by Tata Betita. It is taken out from Jonalyn Viray EP which was released on May 19, 2013. The EP was produced by Creative Media Entertainment and distributed by Universal Records.

Other songs "Sabihin Mo Naman" and "Ayoko Na" were sung by Kris Lawrence and composed by himself and Noah Zuniga. It was the first single of his third album Spread the Love. While "Ayoko Na", by Jessa Zaragoza is composed by her husband, Dingdong Avanzado. It is the third single from her album Pag Wala Na Ang Ulan.

Reception

Ratings
According to AGB Nielsen Philippines' Mega Manila household television ratings, the pilot episode of My Husband's Lover earned a 22.8% rating. While the final episode scored a 25.3% rating.

Critical response
The series garnered a positive response from professional critics, noting network's move in producing an "out-of-the-box" television series. The show was featured on June 17, 2013 issue of UK-based LGBT global news website Gay Star News. It noted that the first episode of My Husband's Lover for its "mature, nuanced and honest depiction of gay characters."

In his review, Walden Sadiri M. Belen of Manila Bulletin responded well to the story, the ensemble's performances, and the director, said that "the story, unconventional and provocative as it is, was treated beautifully and convincingly. The subject matter — a married man and a father having an affair with another man — could  be controversial considering the relatively conservative nature of Filipinos, but so far the series have been decent in presentation and treatment which is fast-paced too. And most noticeable was the remarkable portrayal of the main cast in their respective roles [...]. They are credible in their performances, and especially noted was Tom Rodriguez's portrayal of a closet gay who is, ironically, the son of an army general. But all the other members of the cast also delivered A-1 performances: Kuh Ledesma, Victor Basa, Glydel Mercado and Karel Marquez." Radio and TV personality and Manila Bulletin columnist Mr. Fu praised the show and its cast, said that "the show was beautiful, moving, interesting and promising. It has very interesting characters played by credible actors [...]. Carla Abellana, for one, is able to make audiences feel her love for her mother and husband in the story. She has this very fresh television presence, that you would love to watch her every now and then. Dennis [Trillo] has already proven his acting talent and he does not fail on this show. A best example of a cute "gay who is not so gay", he knows when to use his eyes, his mouth, his whole body to portray the "gayness". Tom, on the other hand, can portray that "paminta" (closeted gay) character with confidence, and charm that makes him appealing on screen. Their on-cam chemistry also makes them effective in their roles. The way they trade lines is believable and their body language seems very natural. Their "revolving glass door" scene where they accidentally meet after years of not communicating was so romantic and intense."

Journals resident entertainment columnist Butch Roldan also reserved high praise for the show, said that "the series explains in a broad spectrum that love cannot be defined by sexual preference alone, that love has its own understanding of what is right and wrong and is ready to suffer even under very harsh circumstances."Journals entertainment columnist, Mario Bautista gave it a mixed review, said that "The series should have started in the thick of things, since the title and the trailers have already shown where the story is going. Dennis [Trillo] should have been there from the start and then they just go back to how the story all started."

Television and film director Jose Javier Reyes congratulated the network "for taking a risk & giving a fresh take on the tired templates of the telenovelas for something new."

LGBT advocate and the author of "Of God and Men: A Life in the Closet", Atty. Raymond Alikpala reviewed "GMA Network deserves congratulations for daring to go down this road less travelled. Eschewing the stereotypical storylines and cardboard cliché characters, the writers of My Husband's Lover are depicting homosexual persons as no different from heterosexuals, which is radical in these parts. Homosexual characters have long been television staples, but they have been limited to supporting roles and comic relief. The series' non-stereotypical depiction of gay men can accomplish what Ladlad failed to do, which is to bring LGBT awareness into the mainstream of Filipino consciousness. Positive media depictions of LGBT persons are crucial in encouraging greater acceptance and recognition of our fundamental equality."

Allan Diones of Abante Tonite said that "Dennis Trillo and Tom Rodriguez has good screen chemistry [and] they are both excellent actors and can feel the emotions of their characters."

Philippine Entertainment Portal'''s Mark Angelo Ching praised Suzette Doctolero and Dominic Zapata for "how the show looks polished. It feels like a lot of brainpower went into the preparation of the show. Some elements are borderline meticulous, like choosing to add a variety of gay characters to battle the gay stereotype head-on." He even added that "unlike other shows that only depicts homosexual men as lustful beasts, or as sidekicks in crass, laughable situations, My Husband's Lover shows its gay characters in normal, everyday situations: going to the gym, working in an office, or relaxing at home. The characters have successful lives not as beauticians or stand-up comedians, but as architects and businessmen." Closing the review, he further added that the show "is progressive—a unique creation in today’s media landscape where gay men are mostly relegated as sidekicks who provide comic relief. Let’s hope that MHL continues to present homosexuals far from their cliché images on television."

The show is under the scrutiny of the Catholic Bishops' Conference of the Philippines - Episcopal Commission on Youth (CBCP-ECY) according to its  executive secretary, Father Conegundo Garganta. He added that television producers and writers should study themes being shown to the viewers, especially to the younger ones, and should be based on moral standards. In response to the CBCP statement, the Malacañang and MTRCB urged viewers to report any complaints about the show if they saw any unacceptable content against its SPG rating. The GMA Network responded that they would continue to comply with MTRCB policies.

The show even impacted the Philippine politics. On July 19, the House of Representatives held a "mock" session for the new representatives which was about investigating the possible ending of the show. On August 8, 2013, Albay - 1st District representative Edcel Lagman filed the House Bill 2352 in the 16th Congress. He called it the My Husband's Lover bill which seeks to expand the scope of Article 333 of the Revised Penal Code which only imposes punishment for a spouse having a sexual intercourse to another person of the opposite sex, other than their husband/wife. With this bill, it will add same-sex adultery to provide equality in the society.

Accolades

Concert
A concert for the show, One More Try: My Husband's Lover The Concert was held on October 12, 2013 in Araneta Coliseum. It was broadcast in television by GMA Network on October 20, 2013. According to AGB Nielsen Philippines' Mega Manila household ratings, the television broadcast of One More Try: My Husband's Lover The Concert'' earned an 11.9% rating.

References

External links
 
 

2013 Philippine television series debuts
2013 Philippine television series endings
2010s LGBT-related drama television series
Filipino-language television shows
GMA Network drama series
Philippine LGBT-related television shows
Philippine romance television series
Television shows set in the Philippines